Raimundo Amador Fernández (born in Sevilla on May 26, 1959) is a Spanish gypsy guitar player.

Biography 

He started playing the guitar for well-known flamenco artists like Fernanda de Utrera or Camarón de la Isla and Paco de Lucía.

Later he followed his own way mixing flamenco and blues (he performed with BB King), founding the Pata Negra group and collaborating with Kiko Veneno in the 80s.

References

External links 

 Raimundo Amador

1959 births
Living people
Musicians from Andalusia
Flamenco
Spanish flamenco guitarists
Spanish male guitarists
People from Seville
Romani guitarists
Spanish Romani people
Flamenco guitarists